Miss Philippines Earth 2015 was the 15th edition of the Miss Philippines Earth pageant. It was held on May 31, 2015 at the Mall of Asia Arena in Pasay, Philippines. Jamie Herrell of Cebu City crowned Angelia Gabrena Ong of the City of Manila at the end of the event. New crowns made by jeweller Ramon Papa were unveiled during the pageant. Ong represented the Philippines at the Miss Earth 2015 pageant and won.

Results

Awards

Special Awards

§ — Costume that won the Best in Cultural Attire designed by Chico Estiva Dos will be worn by the Philippines' representative at the Miss Earth 2015 pageant.

Sponsor Awards

Delegates
The following is the list of the official delegates of Miss Philippines Earth 2015 that represented various cities, municipalities and provinces. There were no representatives from  Cagayan Valley (Region II), Mimaropa / Southern Tagalog Islands (Region IV-B), Caraga (Region XIII) and ARMM.

Judges

International broadcast
  Worldwide - Rappler, YouTube
  United States - The Filipino Channel

References

External links
Miss Philippines Earth official website

2015
2015 beauty pageants
2015 in the Philippines